Indie rock is a subgenre of rock music that originated in the United States, United Kingdom and New Zealand from the 1970s to the 1980s. Originally used to describe independent record labels, the term became associated with the music they produced and was initially used interchangeably with alternative rock or "guitar pop rock".

In the 1980s, the use of the term "indie" (or "indie pop") started to shift from its reference to recording companies to describe the style of music produced on punk and post-punk labels. During the 1990s, grunge and punk revival bands in the US and Britpop bands in the UK broke into the mainstream, and the term "alternative" lost its original counter-cultural meaning. The term "indie rock" became associated with the bands and genres that remained dedicated to their independent status. By the end of the 1990s, indie rock developed several subgenres and related styles, including lo-fi, noise pop, emo, slowcore, post-rock, and math rock. 

In the early 2000s, a new group of bands that played a stripped-down, back-to-basics version of guitar rock emerged into the mainstream. The commercial breakthrough from these scenes was led by four bands: The Strokes, The White Stripes, The Hives and The Vines. Emo also broke into mainstream culture in the early 2000s. By the end of the decade, the proliferation of indie bands was being referred to as an "indie landfill", with the term "landfill indie" becoming used by some critics/websites in the 2020s as subgenre for a certain type of 2000s indie band, in the same way Britpop is used for British guitar music of the 1990s.

In the 2000s, changes in the music industry and the growing importance of the internet enabled a new wave of indie rock bands to achieve mainstream success, leading to questions about its meaningfulness as a term.

Characteristics
The term indie rock, which comes from "independent", describes the small and relatively low-budget labels on which it is released and the do-it-yourself attitude of the bands and artists involved. Although distribution deals are often struck with major corporate companies, these labels and the bands they host have attempted to retain their autonomy, leaving them free to explore sounds, emotions and subjects of limited appeal to large, mainstream audiences. The influences and styles of the artists have been extremely diverse, including punk, psychedelia, post-punk and country. The terms "alternative rock" and "indie rock" were used interchangeably in the 1980s, but after many alternative bands followed Nirvana into the mainstream in the early 1990s, "indie rock" began to be used to describe those bands, working in a variety of styles, that did not pursue or achieve commercial success. Aesthetically speaking, indie rock is characterized as having a careful balance of pop accessibility with noise, experimentation with pop music formulae, sensitive lyrics masked by ironic posturing, a concern with authenticity, and the depiction of a simple guy or girl.

Allmusic identifies indie rock as including a number of "varying musical approaches [not] compatible with mainstream tastes". Linked by an ethos more than a musical approach, the indie rock movement encompassed a wide range of styles, from hard-edged, grunge-influenced bands, through do-it-yourself experimental bands like Pavement, to punk-folk singers such as Ani DiFranco. In fact, there is an everlasting list of genres and subgenres of indie rock. Many countries have developed an extensive local indie scene, flourishing with bands with enough popularity to survive inside the respective country, but virtually unknown elsewhere. However, there are still indie bands that start off locally, but eventually attract an international audience.

Indie rock is noted for having a relatively high proportion of female artists compared with preceding rock genres, a tendency exemplified by the development of the feminist-informed riot grrrl music of acts like Bikini Kill, Bratmobile, 7 Year Bitch, Team Dresch and Huggy Bear. However, Cortney Harding pointed out that this sense of equality is not reflected in the number of women running indie labels.

History

Post-punk and indie pop 

The BBC documentary Music for Misfits: The Story of Indie pinpoints the birth of indie as the 1977 self-publication of the Spiral Scratch EP by Manchester band Buzzcocks. Although Buzzcocks are often classified as a punk band, it has been argued by the BBC and others that the publication of Spiral Scratch independently of a major label led to the coining of the name "indie" ("indie" being the shortened form of "independent").

"Indie pop" and "indie" were originally synonymous. In the mid-1980s, "indie" began to be used to describe the music produced on post-punk labels rather than the labels themselves. The indie rock scene in the US was prefigured by the college rock that dominated college radio playlists, which included key bands like R.E.M. from the US and The Smiths from the UK. These two bands rejected the dominant synthpop of the early 1980s, and helped inspire guitar-based jangle pop; other important bands in the genre included 10,000 Maniacs and the dB's from the US, and The Housemartins and The La's from the UK. In the United States, the term was particularly associated with the abrasive, distortion-heavy sounds of the Pixies, Hüsker Dü, Minutemen, Meat Puppets, Dinosaur Jr., and The Replacements.

In the United Kingdom the C86 cassette, a 1986 NME compilation featuring Primal Scream, The Pastels, The Wedding Present and other bands, was a document of the UK indie scene. It gave its name to the indie pop scene that followed, which was a major influence on the development of the British indie scene as a whole. Major precursors of indie pop included Postcard bands Josef K and Orange Juice, and significant labels included Creation, Subway and Glass. The Jesus and Mary Chain's sound combined the Velvet Underground's "melancholy noise" with Beach Boys pop melodies and Phil Spector's "Wall of Sound" production, while New Order emerged from the demise of post-punk band Joy Division and experimented with techno and house music.

Noise rock and shoegazing 

The most abrasive and discordant outgrowth of punk was noise rock, which emphasised loud distorted electric guitars and powerful drums, and was pioneered by bands including Sonic Youth, Big Black and Butthole Surfers.

Swans, an influential band from New York, is identified as part of the No Wave scene which included Lydia Lunch, and James Chance & The Contortions.  These bands were documented by Brian Eno on the seminal compilation album No New York.  A number of prominent indie rock record labels were founded during the 1980s. These include Washington, D.C.'s Dischord Records in 1980, Seattle's Sub Pop Records in 1986 and New York City's Matador Records and Durham, North Carolina's Merge Records in 1989. Chicago's Touch and Go Records was founded as a fanzine in 1979 and began to release records during the 1980s.

The Jesus and Mary Chain, along with Dinosaur Jr, indie pop and the dream pop of Cocteau Twins, were the formative influences for the shoegazing movement of the late 1980s. Named for the band members' tendency to stare at their feet and guitar effects pedals onstage rather than interact with the audience, acts like My Bloody Valentine, and later Slowdive and Ride created a loud "wash of sound" that obscured vocals and melodies with long, droning riffs, distortion, and feedback.

The other major movement at the end of the 1980s was the drug-fuelled Madchester scene. Based around The Haçienda, a nightclub in Manchester owned by New Order and Factory Records, Madchester bands such as Happy Mondays and The Stone Roses mixed acid house dance rhythms, Northern soul and funk with melodic guitar pop.

Development: 1990s

Alternative enters the mainstream

The 1990s brought major changes to the alternative rock scene. Grunge bands such as Nirvana, Pearl Jam, Soundgarden, and Alice in Chains broke into the mainstream, achieving commercial chart success and widespread exposure. Punk revival bands like Green Day and The Offspring also became popular and were grouped under the "alternative" umbrella. Similarly, in the United Kingdom Britpop saw bands like Blur and Oasis emerge into the mainstream, abandoning the regional, small-scale and political elements of the 1980s indie scene. Bands like Hüsker Dü and Violent Femmes were just as prominent during this time period, yet they have remained iconoclastic, and are not the bands that are frequently cited as inspirations to the current generation of indie rockers.

As a result of alternative rock bands moving into the mainstream, the term "alternative" lost its original counter-cultural meaning and began to refer to the new, commercially lighter form of music that was now achieving mainstream success. It has been argued that even the term "sellout"  lost its meaning as grunge made it possible for a niche movement, no matter how radical, to be co-opted by the mainstream, cementing the formation of an individualist, fragmented culture. It is argued that staying independent became a career choice for bands privy to industry functions rather than an ideal, as resistance to the market evaporated in favor of a more synergistic culture.

Lo-fi and 'slacker rock' scene

The term "indie rock" became associated with the bands and genres that remained dedicated to their independent status. Even grunge bands, following their break with success, began to create more independent sounding music, further blurring the lines. Ryan Moore has argued that, in the wake of the appropriation of alternative rock by the corporate music industry, what became known as indie rock increasingly turned to the past to produce forms of "retro" rock that drew on garage rock, surf rock, rockabilly, blues, country and swing.

Other bands drew on a Lo-fi sound which eschewed polished recording techniques for a D.I.Y. ethos. This was spearheaded by Beck, Sebadoh and Pavement, who were joined by eclectic folk and rock acts of the Elephant 6 collective, including Neutral Milk Hotel, Elf Power and of Montreal.

In the United States, the 1990s indie rock scene, closely linked to the aforementioned lo-fi movement included bands such as Pavement, Sebadoh, Guided by Voices, Built to Spill and Modest Mouse. The 1992 album Slanted and Enchanted, is considered one of the definitive albums of this era, melding indie rock, lo-fi and slacker rock characteristics.  Rolling Stone called Slanted and Enchanted "the quintessential indie rock album" and placed it on the magazine's list of the 500 greatest albums of all time. There were other notable lo-fi releases during this period such as Guided by Voice's Bee Thousand, which was recorded on four track machines or other home recording devices. In the second half of the decade, the Washington-based group, Modest Mouse continued with the abrasive lo-fi tradition with the 1997 release of The Lonesome Crowded West.

Other regional scenes existed during the early- to mid-1990s. Spin published a 1992 feature about the North Carolina "Triangle" (Raleigh, Durham and Chapel Hill), describing a growing scene of indie-rock bands who were influenced by hardcore punk and post-punk. The Chapel Hill college town, once dubbed the "next Seattle" by industry scouts, featured bands like Archers of Loaf, Superchunk and Polvo. Superchunk's single "Slack Motherfucker" has also been credited with popularizing the "slacker" stereotype, and has been called a defining anthem of 90s indie-rock.

In Chicago, the 1990s DIY scene has been described as a cross-pollination of indie-rock, post-punk and jazz.

While this style of music gained traction early on, by the end of the decade interest from both the industry and the public had waned. Critics have pointed to changing music tastes, as seen in the dominance of other pop and rock genres, as a key factor leading to the decline of this scene.

Indie electronic

Indie electronic or indietronica covers rock-based artists who share an affinity for electronic music, using samplers, synthesizers, drum machines, and computer programs. Less a style and more a categorization, it describes an early 1990s trend of acts who followed in the traditions of early electronic music (composers of the BBC Radiophonic Workshop), krautrock and synth-pop. Progenitors of the genre were English bands Disco Inferno, Stereolab, and Space. Most musicians in the genre can be found on independent labels like Warp, Morr Music, Sub Pop or Ghostly International. Examples include Broadcast, MGMT, LCD Soundsystem and Animal Collective.

Diversification
By the end of the 1990s, indie rock developed a number of subgenres and related styles. Following indie pop, these included lo-fi, noise pop, sadcore, post-rock, space rock and math rock. The work of Talk Talk and Slint helped inspire post-rock (an experimental style influenced by jazz and electronic music, pioneered by Bark Psychosis and taken up by acts such as Tortoise, Stereolab, and Laika), as well as leading to more dense and complex, guitar-based math rock, developed by acts like Polvo and Chavez. Built to Spill's 1999 album Keep It Like a Secret helped to shape the indie-rock sound of the early 2000s.

Space rock looked back to progressive roots, with drone-heavy and minimalist acts like Spacemen 3 in the 1980s, Spectrum and Spiritualized, and later groups including Flying Saucer Attack, Godspeed You! Black Emperor and Quickspace. In contrast, sadcore emphasized pain and suffering through melodic use of acoustic and electronic instrumentation in the music of bands like American Music Club and Red House Painters.

The revival of Baroque pop reacted against lo-fi and experimental music by placing an emphasis on melody and classical instrumentation, with artists like Arcade Fire, Belle and Sebastian, Rufus Wainwright, Beirut and The Decemberists.

During the 1990s a number of groups, such as Sunny Day Real Estate and Weezer, diversified the emo genre from its hardcore punk roots. A number of Midwestern emo groups started to form during the mid-1990s including The Promise Ring, The Get Up Kids, and American Football. Weezer's Pinkerton (1996) introduced the emo genre to a wider and more mainstream audience. Emo also broke into mainstream culture in the early 2000s, with the platinum-selling success of Jimmy Eat World's Bleed American (2001) and Dashboard Confessional's The Places You Have Come to Fear the Most (2001). The new emo had a more refined sound than in the 1990s and a far greater appeal amongst adolescents than its earlier incarnations. At the same time, use of the term "emo" expanded beyond the musical genre, becoming associated with fashion, a hairstyle and any music that expressed emotion. During the  2000s, emo was played by multi-platinum acts such as Fall Out Boy, My Chemical Romance, Paramore, and Panic! at the Disco.

Proliferation: 2000s

Commercial interest and growth 
In the 2000s, the changing music industry, the decline in record sales, the growth of new digital technology and increased use of the Internet as a tool for music promotion, allowed a new wave of indie rock bands to achieve mainstream success. Existing indie bands that were now able to enter the mainstream included more musically and emotionally complex bands including Modest Mouse (whose 2004 album Good News for People Who Love Bad News reached the US top 40 and was nominated for a Grammy Award), Bright Eyes (who in 2004 had two singles at the top of the Billboard magazine Hot 100 Single Sales) and Death Cab for Cutie (whose 2005 album Plans debuted at number four in the US, remaining on the Billboard charts for nearly one year and achieving platinum status and a Grammy nomination). This new commercial breakthrough and the widespread use of the term indie to other forms of popular culture, led a number of commentators to suggest that indie rock had ceased to be a meaningful term.

Rob Mitchum introduced the idea of indie rock bands being dadrock to Pitchfork when he used the term in a 2007 review for Sky Blue Sky, the sixth studio album by indie rock-alt country band Wilco. Mitchum said that he had heard the term from Pitchfork's Chris Ott, who had seen the term used in the British press of the 1990s when they were describing Britpop bands like Oasis and Kula Shaker.

Post-punk revival

In the early 2000s, a new group of bands that played a stripped-down and back-to-basics version of guitar rock emerged into the mainstream, which some termed a post-punk revival, but because the bands came from across the globe, cited diverse influences (from traditional blues, through new wave to grunge), and adopted differing styles of dress, their unity as a genre has been disputed.

The commercial breakthrough of the genre came in early 2000s with the success of; The Strokes, The White Stripes, The Vines, and The Hives. They were christened by parts of the media as the "The" bands, and dubbed "the saviours of rock 'n' roll", prompting Rolling Stone magazine to declare on its September 2002 cover, "Rock is Back!"

A second wave of bands that managed to gain international recognition as a result of the movement included Interpol, the Black Keys, the Killers, Kings of Leon, Modest Mouse, the Shins, the Bravery, Spoon, the Hold Steady, and the National in the US, and Franz Ferdinand, Bloc Party, the Futureheads, The Cribs, the Libertines, Kaiser Chiefs and the Kooks in the UK. Arctic Monkeys were the most prominent act to owe their initial commercial success to the use of Internet social networking, with two No. 1 singles and Whatever People Say I Am, That's What I'm Not (2006), which became the fastest-selling debut album in British chart history.

Landfill indie
By the end of the 2000s, the proliferation of primarily UK-based indie bands that appeared after the success of The Strokes and The Libertines, was being referred to "landfill indie", a description coined by Andrew Harrison of The Word magazine. Several bands achieved rapid but unsustained success, such as The Pigeon Detectives, Joe Lean & The Jing Jang Jong and The Paddingtons.

As the 1980s idea of indie (referring to a group of self-financed record companies set up by a bunch of 'mavericks' and the bands they liked) was devalued throughout the Britpop-era so that indie ended up describing a form of contemporary guitar-based pop music, a number of new acts started to be associated with the old 'post-punk' term, even though by then these revivalists were 'post-post-Britpop'. Acts falling into this category include Editors and Maxïmo Park.

There continued to be commercial successes like Kasabian's Velociraptor! (2011) and Arctic Monkeys's Suck It and See (2011), which reached number one in the UK, and Arcade Fire's The Suburbs (2010), The Black Keys's Turn Blue (2014), Kings of Leon's Walls (2016), The Killers's Wonderful Wonderful (2017), which reached number one on the Billboard charts in the United States and the official chart in the United Kingdom, with Arcade Fire's album winning a Grammy for Album of The Year in 2011.

See also
 Independent music
 Indie music scene
 List of indie rock musicians
 Underground music

References 

 
2000s fads and trends
2000s in music
2010s in music